Somontano de Barbastro (Aragonese: Semontano de Balbastro) is a comarca in Province of Huesca, Aragon, Spain.

Somontano borders the counties of Sobrarbe and Alto Gállego to the north, Ribagorza and La Litera to the east, Cinca Medio to the southwest, the Monegros desert to the south and Hoya de Huesca to the west.

As its Latin name suggests, Somontano, meaning "beneath the mountain", lies at the foothills of the Pyrenees.  The area is abundantly irrigated by four important rivers which flow down from the north: the Alcanadre, Cinca, Ésera and the river Vero.

The primary economy of the county has always been agricultural and livestock farming based. Wheat and grains, as well as olives are the primary crops. Its wine production received a denominación de origen in 1984. The city of Barbastro, home to about 85% of the county's population, is a regional hub for the food industry, construction and chemical industry.

The county is also home to the Sierra de Guara, a vast Open Space preserve with canyons and gorges and over 60 limestone caves with prehistoric cave paintings, which led UNESCO to declare it as a World Heritage Site in 1998.

Municipalities
Abiego, Adahuesca, Alquézar, Azara, Azlor, Barbastro, Barbuñales, Berbegal, Bierge, Castejón del Puente, Castillazuelo, Colungo, Estada, Estadilla, El Grado, Hoz y Costean, Ilche, Laluenga, Laperdiguera, Lascellas-Ponzano, Naval, Olvena, Peralta de Alcofea, Peraltilla, Pozán de Vero, Salas Altas, Salas Bajas, Santa María de Dulcis and Torres de Alcanadre

See also
 Somontano D.O. wine area

External links
Official comarca website in English

Comarcas of Aragon
Geography of the Province of Huesca